Rattanon Wannasrichan (born 11 July 1995) is a Thai professional golfer who plays on the Asian Tour. Wannasrichan turned professional in 2012. He clinched his first Asian Tour title at the Thailand Open in May 2017.

Professional wins (6)

Asian Tour wins (1)

Asian Tour playoff record (0–1)

Asian Development Tour wins (1)

1Co-sanctioned by the Taiwan PGA Tour

All Thailand Golf Tour wins (3)

Thailand PGA Tour wins (1)

References

External links

Rattanon Wannasrichan
Asian Tour golfers
Southeast Asian Games medalists in golf
Rattanon Wannasrichan
Competitors at the 2011 Southeast Asian Games
1995 births
Living people